On a Rolling Ball is the first studio album by the rock band the Gabe Dixon Band. It was released in 2002 on Warner Bros. Records.

Track listing
More Than It Would Seem
Corner Café
Bird Dancer
Everything's OK
Your Last Fool
Expiration Date
Love Story
Sitting at the Station
Just a Dream
One to the World
Now
Happy Woman
Come Around
Beauty of the Sea

2002 debut albums
Albums produced by David Kahne
Gabe Dixon albums